M. minuta can refer to a few different species.  The specific epithet  means "minute" or "small".

 Macrolopha minuta, a beetle in the genus Macrolopha
 Manuherikia minuta, an extinct species of duck
 Marchena minuta, a jumping spider
 Marsilea minuta, or dwarf waterclover, an aquatic fern
 Masdevallia minuta, an orchid in the genus Masdevallia
 Megasporoporia minuta, a crust fungus in the family Polyporaceae
 Melibe minuta, a nudibranch in the genus Melibe
 Melica minuta, a grass in the family Poaceae
 Metleucauge minuta, a spider in the genus Metleucauge
 Menegazzia minuta, a lichen in the family Parmeliaceae
 Miaenia minuta, a beetle in the family Cerambycidae
 Micronycteris minuta, the white-bellied big-eared bat
 Micropilina minuta, a mollusk in the genus Micropilina
 Microrape minuta, a moth of the family Megalopygidae
 Mimozotale minuta, a beetle in the family Cerambycidae
 Ministigmata minuta, a spider in the family Microstigmatidae
 Minutaleyrodes minuta, a whitefly in the family Aleyrodidae
 Minutargyrotoza minuta, a moth of the family Tortricidae
 Monomastix minuta, a green algae in the genus Monomastix
 Mordellistena minuta, a beetle in the family Mordellidae
 Mustela minuta, synonym for Palaeogale minuta, an extinct mammal in the genus Palaeogale
 Myolepta minuta, a hoverfly in the genus Myolepta
 Myriogramme minuta, a red algae in the genus Myriogramme
 Myrmekiaphila minuta, a trapdoor spider in the genus Myrmekiaphila